The Clark County Coroner's Office (CCOCME) investigates all deaths caused by any criminal means, violence or suicide, and any unattended death, whatever the cause.  The CCOCME provides identification, performs autopsies or medical examinations, locates and notifies next-of-kin, and carries out any other requirements regarding deaths that fall under its jurisdiction. 

The Clark County Office of the Coroner/Medical Examiner is the only coroner's office in the United States that is accredited by both the International Association of Coroners and Medical Examiners (IACME) and the National Board of Medical Examiners (NBME). 

Melanie Rouse is serving as Clark County Coroner

References

External links
 

County government agencies in Nevada
Government of Clark County, Nevada